Sir Graham James Hearne  (born 23 November 1937) is a British businessman who was chairman of Enterprise Oil from 1991  until 2002, having joined Enterprise as chief executive in 1984.

He practiced as a solicitor at Pinsent & Co and at Fried, Frank, Harris, Shriver & Jacobson in New York. He served with the Industrial Reorganisation Congress before moving on to N M Rothschild & Sons, where he remained a non-executive director until June 2010. He was High Sheriff of Greater London in 1995-96. He was awarded the CBE in 1990, and knighted in 1998.

References

Living people
Place of birth missing (living people)
Commanders of the Order of the British Empire
British businesspeople
Businesspeople awarded knighthoods
High Sheriffs of Greater London
Knights Bachelor
N M Rothschild & Sons people
People associated with Fried, Frank, Harris, Shriver & Jacobson
1937 births